Reggaeton, also known as reggaetón and reguetón, is a style of popular and electronic music that originated in Panama during the late 1980s. It was later popularized in Puerto Rico.

It has evolved from dancehall and has been influenced by American hip hop, Latin American, and Caribbean music. Vocals include rapping and singing, typically in Spanish.

Reggaeton is regarded as one of the most popular music genres in the Spanish-speaking Caribbean, including Puerto Rico, Panama, Dominican Republic, Cuba, Colombia, and Venezuela. Over the 2010s, the genre has seen increased popularity across Latin America, as well as acceptance within mainstream Western music.

Etymology 
The word reggaeton (formed from the word reggae plus the augmentative suffix ) was first used in 1988 when El General's representative Michael Ellis gave it that name to describe it as "reggae grande" (big reggae). The spellings reggaeton and reggaetón are common, although prescriptivist sources such as the Fundéu BBVA and the Academia Puertorriqueña de la Lengua Española recommend the spelling reguetón, as it conforms more closely with traditional Spanish spelling rules.

History 

DJ Playero and DJ Nelson were inspired by hip hop and dancehall to produce "riddims", the first reggaeton tracks. As Caribbean and African-American music gained momentum in Puerto Rico, reggae rap in Spanish marked the beginning of the Boricua underground and was a creative outlet for many young people. This created an inconspicuous-yet-prominent underground youth culture which sought to express itself. As a youth culture existing on the fringes of society and the law, it has often been criticized. The Puerto Rican police launched a campaign against underground music by confiscating cassette tapes from music stores under penal obscenity codes, levying fines and demonizing rappers in the media. Bootleg recordings and word of mouth became the primary means of distribution for this music until 1998, when it coalesced into modern reggaeton. The genre's popularity increased when it was discovered by international audiences during the early 2000s.

The new genre, simply called "underground" and later "", had explicit lyrics about drugs, violence, poverty, friendship, love and sex. These themes, depicting the troubles of inner-city life, can still be found in reggaeton. Despite that, the quality of the cassettes was good enough to help increase their popularity among Puerto Rican youth. The cassettes were sold or distributed on the streets from the trunks of cars. The availability and quality of the cassettes led to reggaeton's popularity, which crossed socioeconomic barriers in the Puerto Rican music scene. The most popular cassettes in the early 1990s were DJ Negro's The Noise I and II and DJ Playero's 37 and 38. Gerardo Cruet, who created the recordings, spread the genre from the marginalized residential areas into other sectors of society, particularly private schools.

By the mid-1990s, "underground" cassettes were being sold in music stores. The genre caught on with middle-class youth, then found its way into the media. By this time, Puerto Rico had several clubs dedicated to the underground scene; Club Rappers in Carolina and PlayMakers in Puerto Nuevo were the most notable. Bobby "Digital" Dixon's "Dem Bow" production was played in clubs. Underground music was not originally intended to be club music. In South Florida, DJ Laz and Hugo Diaz of the Diaz Brothers were popularizing the genre from Palm Beach to Miami.

Underground music in Puerto Rico was harshly criticized. In February 1995, there was a government-sponsored campaign against underground music and its cultural influence. Puerto Rican police raided six record stores in San Juan, hundreds of cassettes were confiscated and fines imposed in accordance with Laws 112 and 117 against obscenity. The Department of Education banned baggy clothing and underground music from schools. For months after the raids local media demonized rappers, calling them "irresponsible corrupters of the public order."

In 1995, DJ Negro released The Noise 3 with a mockup label reading, "Non-explicit lyrics". The album had no cursing until the last song. It was a hit, and underground music continued to seep into the mainstream. Senator Velda González of the Popular Democratic Party and the media continued to view the movement as a social nuisance.

During the mid-1990s, the Puerto Rican police and National Guard confiscated reggaeton tapes and CDs to get "obscene" lyrics out of the hands of consumers. Schools banned hip hop clothing and music to quell reggaeton's influence. In 2002, Senator González led public hearings to regulate the sexual "slackness" of reggaeton lyrics. Although the effort did not seem to negatively affect public opinion about reggaeton, it reflected the unease of the government and the upper social classes with what the music represented. Because of its often sexually-charged content and its roots in poor, urban communities, many middle- and upper-class Puerto Ricans found reggaeton threatening, "immoral, as well as artistically deficient, a threat to the social order, apolitical".

Despite the controversy, reggaeton slowly gained acceptance as part of Puerto Rican culture — helped, in part, by politicians including González who began to use reggaeton in election campaigns to appeal to younger voters in 2003. Puerto Rican mainstream acceptance of reggaeton has grown and the genre has become part of popular culture, including a 2006 Pepsi commercial with Daddy Yankee and PepsiCo's choice of Ivy Queen as musical spokesperson for Mountain Dew. Other examples of greater acceptance in Puerto Rico are religiously- and educationally-influenced lyrics; Reggae School is a rap album produced to teach math skills to children, similar to School House Rock. Reggaeton expanded when other producers, such as DJ Nelson and DJ Eric, followed DJ Playero. During the 1990s, Ivy Queen's 1996 album En Mi Imperio, DJ Playero's Playero 37 (introducing Daddy Yankee) and The Noise: Underground, The Noise 5 and The Noise 6 were popular in Puerto Rico and the Dominican Republic. Don Chezina, Tempo, Eddie Dee, Baby Rasta & Gringo and Lito & Polaco were also popular.

The name "reggaeton" became prominent during the early 2000s, characterized by the dembow beat. It was coined in Puerto Rico to describe a unique fusion of Puerto Rican music. Reggaeton is currently popular throughout Latin America. It increased in popularity with Latino youth in the United States when DJ Joe and DJ Blass worked with Plan B and Sir Speedy on Reggaeton Sex, Sandunguero and Fatal Fantasy.

2004: Crossover 
In 2004, reggaeton became popular throughout the United States and Europe. Tego Calderón was receiving airplay in the U.S., and the music was popular among youth. Daddy Yankee's El Cangri.com became popular that year in the country, as did Héctor & Tito. Luny Tunes and Noriega's Mas Flow, Yaga & Mackie's Sonando Diferente, Tego Calderón's El Abayarde, Ivy Queen's Diva, Zion & Lennox's Motivando a la Yal and the Desafío compilation were also well-received. Rapper N.O.R.E. released a hit single, "Oye Mi Canto". Daddy Yankee released Barrio Fino and a hit single, "Gasolina", opening the door for reggaeton globally. Tego Calderón recorded the singles "Pa' Que Retozen" and "Guasa Guasa". Don Omar was popular, particularly in Europe, with "Pobre Diabla" and "Dale Don Dale". Other popular reggaeton artists include Tony Dize, Angel & Khriz, Nina Sky, Dyland & Lenny, RKM & Ken-Y, Julio Voltio, Calle 13, Héctor el Father, Wisin & Yandel and Tito El Bambino. In late 2004 and early 2005, inspired by the success of "Gasolina", Shakira collaborated with Alejandro Sanz to record "La Tortura" and "La Tortura – Shaketon Remix" for her album, Fijación Oral Vol. 1, further popularizing reggaeton. Four reggaeton songs were sung at the 2005 MTV Video Music Awards: by Don Omar ("Dile"), Tego Calderón, Daddy Yankee, and Shakira with Sanz – the first time any reggaeton song was performed on that stage.

Musicians began to incorporate bachata into reggaeton, with Ivy Queen releasing singles ("Te He Querido, Te He Llorado" and "La Mala") featuring bachata's signature guitar sound, slower, romantic rhythms and emotive singing style. Daddy Yankee's "Lo Que Paso, Paso" and Don Omar's "Dile" are also bachata-influenced. In 2005 producers began to remix existing reggaeton music with bachata, marketing it as bachaton: "bachata, Puerto Rican style".

2006–2017: Topping the charts 
In May 2006, Don Omar's King of Kings was the highest-ranking reggaeton LP to date on the U.S. charts, debuting atop the Top Latin Albums chart and peaking at number seven on the Billboard 200 chart. Omar's single, "Angelito", topped the Billboard Latin Rhythm Radio Chart. He broke Britney Spears' in-store-appearance sales record at Downtown Disney's Virgin music store.

That same year, Shakira's "Hips Don't Lie", featuring Wyclef Jean of the Fugees, became "the most popular song in the genre's history", with "the dembow beat in the background, the trumpet sample of Jerry Rivera's "Amores como el nuestro" in the chorus, the obvious salsa influence."

In June 2007, Daddy Yankee's El Cartel III: The Big Boss set a first-week sales record for a reggaeton album, with 88,000 copies sold. It topped the Top Latin Albums and Top Rap Albums charts, the first reggaeton album to do so on the latter. The album peaked at number nine on the Billboard 200, the second-highest reggaeton album on the mainstream chart.

The third-highest-ranking reggaeton album was Wisin & Yandel's Wisin vs. Yandel: Los Extraterrestres, which debuted at number 14 on the Billboard 200 and number one on the Top Latin Albums chart later in 2007. In 2008 Daddy Yankee soundtrack to his film, Talento de Barrio, debuted at number 13 on the Billboard 200 chart. It peaked at number one on the Top Latin Albums chart, number three on Billboard's Top Soundtracks and number six on the Top Rap Albums chart. In 2009, Wisin & Yandel's La Revolución debuted at number seven on the Billboard 200, number one on the Top Latin Albums and number three on the Top Rap Albums charts.

By 2008, Reggaeton was the "biggest-selling genre of Latin music" and one of its artists, Tego Calderon, was using it to describe and encourage black pride.

2017–present: "Despacito" effect 

In 2017, the music video for "Despacito" by Luis Fonsi featuring Daddy Yankee reached one billion views in less than three months. From January 2018 to November 2020, the music video was the most viewed YouTube video of all-time. With its 3.3 million certified sales plus track-equivalent streams, "Despacito" became one of the best-selling Latin singles in the United States. The success of the song and its remix version led Daddy Yankee to become the most listened-to artist worldwide on the streaming service Spotify on 9 July 2017, being the first Latin artist to do so. He later became the fifth most listened-to male artist and the sixth overall of 2017 on Spotify. In June 2017, "Despacito" was cited by Billboards Leila Cobo as the song that renewed interest in the Latin music market from recording labels in the United States. Julyssa Lopez of The Washington Post stated that the successes of "Despacito" and J Balvin's "Mi Gente" is "the beginning of a new Latin crossover era." Stephanie Ho of Genius website wrote that "the successes of 'Despacito' and 'Mi Gente' could point to the beginning of a successful wave for Spanish-language music in the US." Ho also stated that "as 'Despacito' proves, fans don't need to understand the language in order to enjoy the music", referring to the worldwide success of the song, including various non-Spanish-speaking countries.

"Te Boté" and the minimalist dembow 
In April 2018, "Te Boté" was released by Nio Garcia, Casper Magico, Darell, Ozuna, Bad Bunny and Nicky Jam. It reached number one on the Billboard Hot Latin Songs chart. It currently has over 1.8 billion views on YouTube. Many artists began to mark strong commercial trends in a market dominated by mixing Latin trap and reggaeton followed by a new minimalist dembow rhythm. For example, songs such as "Adictiva" by Daddy Yankee and Anuel AA, "Asesina" by Brytiago and Darell, "Cuando Te Besé" by Becky G and Paulo Londra, "No Te Veo" by Casper Magico and many other songs have been made in this style.

Characteristics

Rhythm 
The dembow riddim was created by Jamaican dancehall producers during the late 1980s and early 1990s. Dembow consists of a kick drum, kickdown drum, palito, snare drum, timbal, timballroll and (sometimes) a high-hat cymbal. Dembow's percussion pattern was influenced by dancehall and other West Indian music (soca, calypso and cadence); this gives dembow a pan-Caribbean flavor. Steely & Clevie, creators of the Poco Man Jam riddim, are usually credited with the creation of dembow. At its heart is the 3+3+2 (tresillo) rhythm, complemented by a bass drum in 4/4 time.

The riddim was first highlighted by Shabba Ranks in "Dem Bow", from his 1991 album Just Reality. To this day, elements of the song's accompaniment track are found in over 80% of all reggaeton productions. During the mid-1980s, dancehall music was revolutionized by the electronic keyboard and drum machine; subsequently, many dancehall producers used them to create different dancehall riddims. Dembow's role in reggaeton is a basic building block, a skeletal sketch in percussion.

In Reggaeton 'dembow' also incorporates identical Jamaican riddims such as Bam Bam, Hot This Year, Poco Man Jam, Fever Pitch, Red Alert, Trailer Reloaded and Big Up riddims, and several samples are often used. Some reggaeton hits incorporate a lighter, electrified version of the riddim. Examples are "Pa' Que la Pases Bien" and "Quiero Bailar", which uses the Liquid riddim.

Since 2018 a new variation of the Dembow rhythm has emerged; Starting with Te Bote, a sharper minimalist Dembow has become a stable of Reggaeton production which has allowed for more syncopated rhythmic experiments.

Lyrics and themes 
Reggaeton lyrical structure resembles that of hip hop. Although most reggaeton artists recite their lyrics rapping (or resembling rapping) rather than singing, many alternate rapping and singing. Reggaeton uses traditional verse-chorus-bridge hip hop structure. Like hip hop, reggaeton songs have a hook which is repeated throughout the song. Latino ethnic identity is a common musical, lyrical and visual theme.

Unlike hip-hop CDs, reggaeton discs generally do not have parental advisories. An exception is Daddy Yankee's Barrio Fino en Directo (Barrio Fino Live), whose live material (and with Snoop Dogg in "Gangsta Zone") were labeled explicit. Snoop Dogg and Daddy Yankee filmed the video for "Gangsta Zone" in Torres Sabana housing projects in Carolina, Puerto Rico on January 27, 2006. Shot in grayscale, Daddy Yankee said the video depicts "the real way we live on the island".

Artists such as Alexis & Fido circumvent radio and television censorship by sexual innuendo and lyrics with double meanings. Some songs have raised concerns about their depiction of women. Although reggaeton began as a mostly-male genre, the number of women artists has been a slowly increasing and include the "Queen of Reggaeton", Ivy Queen, Mey Vidal, K-Narias, Adassa, La Sista and Glory.

Dance 

Sandungueo, or perreo, is a dance associated with reggaeton which emerged during the early 1990s in Puerto Rico. It focuses on grinding, with one partner facing the back of the other (usually male behind female). Another way of describing this dance is "back-to-front", where the woman presses her rear into the pelvis of her partner to create sexual stimulation. Since traditional couple dancing is face-to-face (such as square dancing and the waltz), reggaeton dancing initially shocked observers with its sensuality but was featured in several music videos. It is also known as daggering, grinding or juking in the English-speaking areas of the U.S.

Popularity

Latin America 
Over the past decade, reggaeton has received mainstream recognition in the Spanish-speaking Caribbean, where the genre originated from, including Puerto Rico, Cuba, Panama, the Dominican Republic, Colombia and Venezuela, where it is now regarded as one of the most popular music genres. Reggaeton has also seen increased popularity in the wider Latin America region, including in El Salvador, Honduras, Guatemala, Nicaragua, Costa Rica, Mexico, Argentina, Chile, Uruguay, Ecuador and Peru.

In Cuba, reggaeton came to incorporate elements of traditional Cuban music, leading to the hybrid Cubaton. Two bands credited with popularizing Cubaton are Máxima Alerta (founded in 1999) and Cubanito 20.02. The former is notable for fusing Cubaton with other genres, such as son Cubano, conga, cumbia, salsa, merengue, and Cuban rumba, as well as styles and forms such as rap and ballads, whereas the latter's music is influenced more by Jamaican music. The government of Cuba imposed restrictions on reggaeton in public places in 2012. In March 2019, the government went a step further; they banned the "aggressive, sexually explicit and obscene messages of reggaeton" from radio and television, as well as performances by street musicians.

The first name of reggaeton in Brazil was the Señores Cafetões group, who became known in 2007 with the track "Piriguete" - which at the time was mistakenly mistaken by Brazilians for hip hop and Brazilian funk because reggaeton was still a genre almost unknown in the country. In Brazil, this musical genre only reached a reasonable popularity around the middle of the decade of 2010. The first great success of the genre in the country was the song "Yes or no" by Anitta with Maluma. One of the explanations for reggaeton has not reached the same level of popularity that exists in other Latin American countries is due to the fact that Brazil is a Portuguese-speaking country, which has historically led it to become more isolationist than other Latin American countries in the musical scene. The musical rhythm only became popular in the country when it reached other markets, like the American. The genre is now overcoming the obstacle of language. Some of the biggest names in the Brazilian music market have partnered with artists from other Latin American countries and explored the rhythm.

United States 
The New York-based rapper N.O.R.E., also known as Noreaga, produced Nina Sky's 2004 hit "Oye Mi Canto", which featured Tego Calderón and Daddy Yankee, and reggaeton became popular in the U.S. Daddy Yankee then caught the attention of many hip-hop artists with his song "Gasolina", and that year XM Radio introduced its reggaeton channel, Fuego (XM). Although XM Radio removed the channel in December 2007 from home and car receivers, it can still be streamed from the XM Satellite Radio website. Reggaeton is the foundation of a Latin-American commercial-radio term, hurban, a combination of "Hispanic" and "urban" used to evoke the musical influences of hip hop and Latin American music. Reggaeton, which evolved from dancehall and reggae, and with influences from hip hop has helped Latin-Americans contribute to urban American culture and keep many aspects of their Hispanic heritage. The music relates to American socioeconomic issues, including gender and race, in common with hip hop.

Europe 
Although reggaeton is less popular in Europe than it is in Latin America, it appeals to Latin American immigrants, especially in Spain. A Spanish media custom, "La Canción del Verano" ("The Song of the Summer"), in which one or two songs define the season's mood, was the basis of the popularity of reggaeton songs such as "Baila Morena" by Héctor & Tito and Daddy Yankee's "Gasolina" in 2005.

Asia 
In the Philippines, reggaeton artists primarily use the Filipino language instead of Spanish or English. One example of a popular local reggaeton act is Zamboangueño duo Dos Fuertes, who had a dance hit in 2007 with "Tarat Tat", and who primarily uses the Chavacano language in their songs.

In 2020, Malaysian rapper Namewee released the single and music video "China Reggaeton" featuring Anthony Wong. It is the first time reggaeton was sung in the Chinese languages of Mandarin and Hakka and accompanied by traditional Chinese instruments like the erhu, pipa and guzheng, creating a fusion of reggaeton and traditional Chinese musical styles.

Criticism 
Despite the great popularity of the genre as a whole, reggaeton has also attracted criticism due to its constant references to sexual and violent themes. Mexican singer-songwriter Aleks Syntek made a public post on social media complaining that such music was played on Mexico City's airport in the morning with children present. By 2019, other singers who expressed dismay over the genre included vallenato singer Carlos Vives and Heroes Del Silencio singer Enrique Bunbury. That same year, some activists stated that reggaeton music gives way to misogynistic and sadistic messages.

Some reggaeton singers have decided to counteract such accusations. One notable example is singer Flex, who in 2009 committed himself to singing songs with romance messages, a sub genre he dubbed “romantic style”.

See also 

 List of reggaeton musicians
 Reggae en Español
 Panamanian reggaetón
 Dancehall
 Calypso
 Soca
 Latino poetry
 Nuyorican
 Kwaito

References

External links 
 
 

 
Reggae genres
Fusion music genres
Puerto Rican styles of music
Panamanian styles of music
Urbano music genres
2000s in Latin music
2010s in Latin music
2020s in Latin music
Articles containing video clips